The 1976–77 Rugby League Premiership was the third end of season Rugby League Premiership competition.

The winners were St Helens.

First round

+Match awarded to Warrington after Hull Kingston Rovers fielded an ineligible player (Phil Lowe).

Semi-finals

Final

Bracket

* - Indicates only the replay match, not the match ending in a draw.
^ - Match awarded to Warrington. See the First round section above

References

1977 in English rugby league